This is a list of members of the South Australian Legislative Council between 2002 and 2006. As half of the Legislative Council's terms expired at each state election, half of these members were elected at the 1997 state election with terms expiring in 2006, while the other half were elected at the 2002 state election with terms expiring in 2010.

 Terry Cameron had been elected as a Labor member, but had resigned from the party, initially sitting as an independent, and then founding the SA First party in 1999. He did not face re-election in 2002, but the party disbanded soon after the election, and Cameron subsequently returned to being an independent MLC.
 Democrat MLC Mike Elliott resigned on 10 December 2002. Kate Reynolds was appointed to the resulting casual vacancy on 17 February 2003.
 Liberal MLC Diana Laidlaw resigned on 6 June 2003. Michelle Lensink was appointed to the resulting casual vacancy on 26 June 2003.
 Labor MLC Terry Roberts died on 18 February 2006. Bernard Finnigan was appointed to the remaining four years of Roberts' term on 2 May 2006.
 Liberal MLC Angus Redford resigned on 27 February 2006 to contest the marginal House of Assembly seat of Bright at the 2006 state election. Stephen Wade was appointed to the remaining four years of Redford's term on 2 May 2006.

References

 "Statistical Record of the Legislature, 1837–2007", Parliament of South Australia, 2007.
 "History of South Australian Elections, 1857–2006", Dean Jaensch, 2006.

Members of South Australian parliaments by term
21st-century Australian politicians